Midras uncleanness is one of the forms of ritual impurity in Judaism which can be transmitted by either an object or person. The term may be translated as pressure uncleanness.

A midras (lit. "trampled on" object) is an object that can be a carrier of ritual impurity. Common objects that could potentially become unclean, and become a such midras object, include a chair, sofa, mattress, and rug. A person who becomes unclean is categorized as a "father of uncleanliness".

Hebrew Bible 
The general concept of a midras, an object becoming a carrier for uncleanliness, is brought in the book of Leviticus, though the following verse does not employ the Hebrew term midras;

Becoming unclean 
According to Maimonides on Zavim 4:4, the midras object becomes unclean by a person who is a "father of uncleanliness" (such as a man with a seminal emission or a woman in the middle of menstruation) putting most of their body weight in one (or more) of five ways on the midras;
sitting on the midras like a chair
lying on the midras like a rug
leaning on the midras
standing on the midras like a mat
hanging from the midras

Transmitting uncleanliness 
Once the midras becomes unclean, it transmits uncleanliness to clean persons or objects by one of seven ways;
by touching the midras
by carrying the midras
by sitting on the midras
by lying on the midras
by leaning on the midras
by standing on the midras
by hanging from the midras

The person or object who becomes unclean via the midras is categorized as a Rishon L'Tumah.

Purification 
The purification of the midras object is accomplished by immersing the object in a mikveh bath (before sunset), and the subsequent elapse of sunset.

Disqualified objects 
Objects that are not subject to becoming unclean as midras include;
Unformed plates of terracotta,
Any object or vessel of stone,
Fabric or vessels made from fish (or any sea-life)
Objects or vessels affixed to the ground

References 

Jewish ritual purity law
Hebrew words and phrases in Jewish law